Simon Oakland (August 28, 1915 – August 29, 1983) was an American actor of stage, screen, and television.  

During his career, Oakland performed primarily on television, appearing in over 130 series and made-for-television movies between 1951 and 1983. His most notable big-screen roles were in Psycho (1960), West Side Story (1961), The Sand Pebbles (1966), Bullitt (1968), The Hunting Party (1971), and Chato's Land (1972).

Early life and career
Oakland was born in Brooklyn, New York, the eldest of the three sons of immigrant Jewish parents, Jacob Weiss and Ethel Oaklander, born in Romania and Tsarist Russia, respectively. His father was a plasterer and builder. While he later claimed in media interviews to have been born in 1922 (a date repeated in his New York Times obituary), Social Security and vital records indicate he was born Simon Weiss in 1915; his stage name was derived from his mother's maiden name, Oaklander.

He began his performing career as a musician (he was a violinist, an avocation he pursued during his entire career as an actor). Oakland began his acting career in the late 1940s. He enjoyed a series of Broadway hits, including Light Up the Sky, The Shrike, and Inherit the Wind, and theater was one of his lasting passions. He was a concert violinist until the 1940s.

Film and television

In 1955, Oakland made his film debut, albeit uncredited, as an Indiana state trooper in The Desperate Hours.  He next appeared in two films released in 1958:  as Mavrayek in The Brothers Karamazov and as journalist Edward Montgomery in I Want to Live!

Oakland's notable performance in I Want to Live! led to his playing a long series of bullying tough-guy types, usually in positions of authority, but sometimes as villains, or as an admixture of both. He appeared in Psycho as the psychiatrist who, at the end of the film, explains Norman Bates's multiple personality disorder. He appeared in West Side Story, The Sand Pebbles, and Bullitt. He made two guest appearances on CBS's Perry Mason, both times as the murder victim. He also appeared in the syndicated crime drama, Decoy, starring Beverly Garland. Oakland appeared once on the CBS Western Dundee and the Culhane and once on the series Sheriff of Cochise. 

He was a regular, as General Thomas Moore, on NBC's Baa Baa Black Sheep, starring Robert Conrad. He also appeared in two episodes of the original The Twilight Zone TV series and in The Outer Limits as the alien birdman in "Second Chance". In 1974 and 1975, he was a series regular on Kolchak: The Night Stalker, playing newspaper editor Tony Vincenzo. (He had previously played the same character in the two made-for-television movies that served as the pilot for the series.) 

During the 1970s, Oakland appeared in multiple episodes of The Rockford Files, three times as blustery private detective Vern St. Cloud, a nemesis/ antagonist for Jim Rockford.

Personal life
Oakland was married to Lois Lorraine Porta. The couple had one daughter, Barbara.

Death
 
Oakland continued working up to the year of his death. His last credited acting appearance was in the episode "Living and Presumed Dead" on the CBS television series Tucker's Witch. That episode aired three months before Oakland's death from colon cancer in Cathedral City, California, on August 29, 1983, the day after his 68th birthday.

TV and filmography

Notes

References

External links

 
 
 

1915 births
1983 deaths
American male film actors
American male stage actors
American male television actors
Deaths from cancer in California
Deaths from colorectal cancer
People from Brooklyn
Male actors from New York City
Male actors from Los Angeles
20th-century American male actors
American people of Russian-Jewish descent
American people of Romanian-Jewish descent
Western (genre) television actors